Daughters of the Flower Fragrant Garden: Two Sisters Separated by China's Civil War is a 2022 book by Zhuqing Li, published by W. W. Norton & Company. The author tells the story of her two aunts, who were separated on opposite sides after the conclusion of the Chinese Civil War in 1949.

Contents
One aunt, Chen Wenjun, was stranded in Kinmen (Jinmen). Another aunt, known under an assumed name used by the author, Hong, remained in Mainland China. Deidre Mask of The New York Times wrote that "it is Hong who suffers the most". Both aunts lived in the Flower Fragrant Garden complex in Fuzhou before the conclusion of the civil war.

Background
Zhuqing Li is an East Asian Studies professor. Her place of employment is Brown University.

Reception
Mask wrote that Daughters of the Flower Fragrant Garden is "absorbing" and that the "struggle" of Hong "drives" the work.

Kirkus Reviews described it as "a poignant story of sisterly love and the search for self-knowledge in the face of considerable challenges".

References

External links
 Zhuqing Li's official website
  - Audio file direct link - Alternate link at WYPR and direct audio file link
 Daughters of the Flower Fragrant Garden - W. W. Norton

2022 non-fiction books
Books about Taiwan
Books about China
21st-century American literature
Chinese Civil War
W. W. Norton & Company books